Cholmondeley  is a surname. Notable people with the surname include:

 David Cholmondeley, 7th Marquess of Cholmondeley (born 1960), British peer and Lord Great Chamberlain of England
 George Cholmondeley, 2nd Earl of Cholmondeley (1666–1733), English soldier
 George Cholmondeley, 3rd Earl of Cholmondeley (1703–1770), British peer and Whig politician
 George Cholmondeley, 1st Marquess of Cholmondeley (1749–1827), British peer and politician
 George Cholmondeley, 2nd Marquess of Cholmondeley (1792–1870), British peer and politician
 George Cholmondeley, 4th Marquess of Cholmondeley (1858–1923), British peer and Lord Chamberlain of England
 George Cholmondeley, 5th Marquess of Cholmondeley (1883–1968), British peer and Lord Great Chamberlain of England
 George Cholmondeley, Viscount Malpas (1724–1764), British soldier and MP
 Hugh Cholmondeley, 1st Earl of Cholmondeley (1662–1725)
 Hugh Cholmondeley, 6th Marquess of Cholmondeley (1919–1980), British peer and Lord Great Chamberlain of England
 Hugh Cholmondeley, 2nd Baron Delamere (1811–1887), British peer and politician
 Hugh Cholmondeley, 3rd Baron Delamere (1870–1931), British settler in Kenya
 Hugh Cholmondeley, 5th Baron Delamere (born 1934), British peer and Kenyan landowner
 Hugh Cholmondeley, 6th Baron Delamere, British peer and Kenyan
 Hugh Cholmondeley (soldier) (1513–1596), English soldier
 James Cholmondeley (1708–1775), British soldier and MP
 Lionel Berners Cholmondeley (1858–1945), British missionary in Japan and historian
 Mary Cholmondeley (1859–1925), English writer
 Richard Cholmondeley (c.1460–1521), English farmer and soldier, Lieutenant of the Tower of London from 1513 to 1520
 Robert Cholmondeley, 1st Earl of Leinster (1584–1659), English Royalist
 Robert Cholmondeley, 1st Viscount Cholmondeley (died 1681), English peer
 Thomas Cholmondeley (disambiguation), various
 William Cholmondeley, 3rd Marquess of Cholmondeley (1800–1884), British peer and politician

See also
 Cholmeley
 Cholmley
 Chumley (disambiguation)

Surnames of English origin